Wang Jilian (Chinese: 王积连;15 February 1946 – 5 June 2016) was a Chinese footballer who played for China PR in the 1976 Asian Cup.

Playing career
Wang Jilian was born in Dalian, he began to play football when he was study in primary school at the age of 8. In 1958, Wang Jilian joined Dalian youth football team. From 1958 to 1965, Wang Jilian  successively played for Dalian youth football, Liaoning worker football team and Liaoning. In 1965, Wang Jilian represented Liaoning to play for 1965 National Games of China, in the same year, Wang jilian was called up to China national football team. in 1966, Wang Jilian represented China to play for 1st Games of the New Emerging Forces and got runner-up. in 1974,Wang Jilian represented China to play for 1974 Asian Games. in 1975,Wang Jilian worked as a player of Liaoning football team to participate in 1975 National Games. In 1976, Wang Jilian played for China PR in the 1976 Asian Cup. in the same year Wang Jilian retired and began to youth player training work in Beijing Chongwen sport school.

Football related work
Wang Jilian returned to play for Beijing Military Region football team in military football match in 1977 for a short time. in 1981, Wang Jilian returned the second time to play for Beijing in Chinese Jia League. in 1985, Wang Jilian returned the third time to play for Beijing worker football team in the 2nd national workers games of China.

Death
On June 5, 2016,  Wang Jilian died in Beijing, age 70.

References

External links
Team China Stats

1946 births
2016 deaths
Chinese footballers
1976 AFC Asian Cup players
China international footballers
Footballers from Dalian
Association football forwards
Footballers at the 1974 Asian Games
Asian Games competitors for China
Liaoning F.C. players
Beijing Guoan F.C. players